Christine Mary Tacon CBE (born 29 October 1959) was a British government administrator. Tacon was the United Kingdom's first Groceries Code Adjudicator.

Early life
Christine was born in the Hartismere Rural District in Suffolk, England. Tacon attended the all-female independent Wycombe Abbey in High Wycombe. Tacon grew up in Norfolk.

Education 
Christine read Production Engineering at Girton College, Cambridge.

Career
In 1982, Christine started at Coats Viyella, working at Dynacast in France and Germany. 
From 2000 to 2012, Christine was managing director of Co-operative Farms.

In 2010, the position of Groceries Code Adjudicator (GCA) was created in U.K. and she was appointed to this position. She oversees the Groceries Supply Code of Practice. 
In 2017, Christine was reappointed as U.K.'s GCA.

She is one of several Ambassador for the March 2019 International Food and Drink event in London, England.

Personal life
Christine speaks German and French. She is a Chartered Engineer. 
She lives in Sutton Lane Ends, Macclesfield. 
She married in October 1992 in Norwich. She now has two children, a daughter born in November 1995 and a son born in July 1998.

In the 2004 Birthday Honours, Christine was appointed a CBE.

References

External links
 Government information
 ChristineTacon.com
 Christine Tacon on carmichaelfisher.com

1959 births
Alumni of Cranfield University
Alumni of Girton College, Cambridge
Commanders of the Order of the British Empire
English businesspeople in retailing
English women in business
Fellows of the Institution of Mechanical Engineers
Ombudsmen in the United Kingdom
People educated at Wycombe Abbey
People from Eye, Suffolk
Living people